A civic center or civic centre is a prominent land area within a community that is constructed to be its focal point or center. It usually contains one or more dominant public buildings, which may also include a government building. Recently, the term "civic center" has been used in reference to an entire central business district of a community or a major shopping center in the middle of a community. In this type of civic center, special attention is paid to the way public structures are grouped and landscaped.

In some American cities, a multi-purpose arena is named "Civic Center", for example Columbus Civic Center.  Such "civic centers" combine venues for sporting events, theaters, concerts and similar events.

In Australia, a civic centre can refer to a civic precinct, a show or meeting venue, or can also be used as a brand of Shopping Centre.

Notable civic centers

India
 Delhi Civic Centre

North America
 Civic Center, Houston
 Seattle Center
 Forest Park, St Louis
 Columbus Civic Center
 Miami Health District
 Tallahassee Civic Center
 Mid-Hudson Civic Center
 San Francisco Civic Center
 Honolulu Capitol District
 National Mall
 Denver Civic Center
 Lee County Civic Center, FL
 Florence Civic Center
 Ottawa Civic Centre
 Hartford Civic Center
 Providence Civic Center
 Springfield Civic Center
 Peoria Civic Center
 Richard J. Daley Center, formerly Chicago Civic Center
 Millennium Park
 Cumberland County Civic Center
 Los Angeles Civic Center
 Saint Paul Civic Center
 Evansville Civic Center Complex
 New York City Civic Center
 Marin County Civic Center

After the amalgamation of Toronto in 1998, five of the six municipalities in the former Metro Toronto used the Civic Centre name in referring to their respective city halls before its abolition.

East York Civic Centre
Etobicoke Civic Centre
North York Civic Centre
Scarborough Civic Centre
York Civic Centre

United Kingdom

In most cases civic centres in the UK are a focus for local government offices and public service buildings. The Cardiff Civic Centre is probably the oldest and best preserved civic centre in the UK. With the reforms of local government in London in 1965 and across England in anticipation of the implementation of the Redcliffe-Maud Report in 1974, a number of local authorities commissioned new civic centres sometimes funded by disposing of their 19th Century Town Hall buildings. Sir Basil Spence was responsible for designing three of these civic centres:

Hampstead Civic Centre, which was only partially completed; and of which only the Swiss Cottage Library (1964) still exists.
Sunderland Civic Centre (1970).
Kensington and Chelsea Civic Centre (1977).

Other noteworthy civic centres include:
Barking and Dagenham Civic Centre at Becontree Heath (1937).
Southampton Civic Centre (1932).
Newport Civic Centre (main building 1940, clock tower completed 1964).
Plymouth Civic Centre (1950–1962), Devon, Architect Hector J W Stirling.
Newcastle Civic Centre (1967).
Civic Centre, Swansea (opened in 1982 as the County Hall)

China
Shenzhen Civic Center

Romania
Bucharest Civic Centre

References

Urban studies and planning terminology
Town squares
Local government
Neighbourhoods